Hastehjuk (also Romanized as Hastehjūk; also known as Hasteh Jīk) is a village in Qatur Rural District, Qatur District, Khoy County, West Azerbaijan Province, Iran. At the 2006 census, its population was 503, in 101 families.

References 

Populated places in Khoy County